Sander Rang or  Paul Charles Leonard Alexander Rang (1793, Utrecht -1844, Mayotte) was a French conchologist and interpreter of Arabic texts. He was, in 1816, one of the survivors of the sinking of the frigate Medusa, on which he was an ensign. He spent a good part of his life in La Rochelle, where he published his early zoological observations, in particular in the bulletins of the Society of Natural Sciences of Charente-Maritimes.In 1841 Rang was one of the founding members of the Société des Amis des Arts now the Musée des Beaux-Arts de La Rochelle.He specialised in marine fauna notably in sea hares, cephalopods and other molluscs and on the heterogenous group known as zoophytes. Sander Rang described many new mollusc species including the sea hares Aplysia dactylomela, Dolabrifera dolabrifera, the cuttlefish Sepia hierredda and the land snails  Striosubulina striatella,  Pleurodonte desidens  and Opeas hannense.

Biography
Sander Rang was born into a family of Protestant bourgeoisie (people with private wealth, an upper class social status, and its related culture) from Vivarais. His grandfather was Alexandre Rang des Adrets (1722-1792) a pastor from Crest, in the Drôme. His father, Jean-Alexandre Rang des Adrets (1757-1824) also a pastor, went into exile in Utrecht. Later he settled in La Rochelle. Sander Rang was born in Utrecht in 1793. He spent a good part of his life in La Rochelle.In 1816, aged 23, he enlisted on La Méduse a frigate ferrying French officials to the port of Saint-Louis, in Senegal. Ineptly commanded, La Méduse struck the Bank of Arguin off the coast of present-day Mauritania and became a total loss. Sander Rang was on the captain's boat and not on the ill-fated raft. His manuscript account of these events was published in 1946.

By then a Chevalier de la Légion d'Honneur, he married Perrine Esther Agathe Louise Cassen-Vaucorbeil (26 August 1805, Saint-Malo - 9 June 1884, La Rochelle) at Île-de-France in 1827. She was a painter taught by Eugène Delacroix and the couple participated in all the cultural activities of La Rochelle.  On 4 October 1829 he left the naval port of Toulon commanding the naval brig (brick de L'Etat) La Champenoise embarked for first Almeria, then Gorée and the Senegal coast then Ile de prince then to Brasil. At the time such voyages were a part of the expansion of the French colonial empire but Rang's naval duties allowed sufficient time to collect molluscs. Promoted to the rank of Captain 1st Class of corvette, he left La Rochelle and became captain of the port of Algiers in 1834. In 1837 he has the rank Officieur superiéure au Corps royal de la Marines and he was appointed administrator (superior commander) of Mayotte in 1842. He died of a fever. His wife married a banker in La Rochelle, Théophile Babut a year later.

Societies
Society of Natural Sciences of Charente-Maritimes
Corresponding Member Société d'Histoire Naturelle de Paris from 1825
Société linnéenne de Bordeaux

Publications
partial list
M. Rang, 1825 Description d’un genre nouveau de la classe des Ptéropodes et de deux espèces nouvelles du genre Clio Annales des sciences naturelles, Paris, Éd. Béchet jeune, vol. 5, 1825, p. 283-287 online BNF
Alexandre Rang and Charles des Moulins, 1828 Description de trois genres nouveaux de coquilles fossiles du terrain tertiaire de Bordeaux, savoir : Spiricella, Gratelupia et Jouannetia (avec la collab. de Charles Des Moulins), Bordeaux, Impr. de R. Laguillotière, 1828, 31 p. online — Extrait du Bulletin d’histoire naturelle de la Société linnéenne de Bordeaux, tome 2, 6e livraison, 23 décembre 1828.
M. Rang, 1827 Description d’une espèce d’Hyale à l’état fossile  Mémoires de la Société d’histoire naturelle de Paris, Paris, Éd. Baudouin frères, vol. 3, 1827, p. 382-383 online
M Rang, 1827 Observations sur le genre Atlante  Mémoires de la Société d’histoire naturelle de Paris, Paris, Éd. Baudouin frères, vol. 3, 1827, p. 372-381  
 1827 with André Étienne d'Audebert de Férussac. Catalogue des espèces de mollusques terrestres et fluviatiles, recueillis par M. Rang, offic. de la marine roy., dans un voyage aux grandes Indes. Bulletin des Sciences Naturelles et de Géologie, deuxième Section du Bulletin Universel des Sciences et de l'Industrie 10 (200): 298-307. 1827 online AnimalBase online BHL
M. Sander Rang, 1828 Histoire naturelle des Aplysiens : première famille de l'ordre des tectibranches De L'imprimerie de Firmin Didot, 1828.Illustrations by Perrine Louise Rang online
M. Rang, 1828  Établissement de la famille des Béroïdes dans l’ordre des Acalèphes libres, et description de deux genres nouveaux qui lui appartiennent Mémoires de la Société d’histoire naturelle de Paris, Paris, Éd. Baudouin frères, vol. 4, 1828, p. 166-173  online
M Rang, 1828 Notice sur quelques mollusques nouveaux appartenant au genre Cléodore, et établissement et monographie du sous-genre Creseis Annales des sciences naturelles Paris, Éd. Crochard, vol. 13, 1828, p. 302-319 online BNF
Rang, Sander. 1829. Manuel de l'histoire naturelle des mollusques et de leurs coquilles : ayant pour base de classification celle de M. le baron Cuvier. Paris. [In French]  online plates 1843 see below.
M. Rang, 1829 Description de cinq espèces de coquilles fossiles appartenant à la classe des Ptéropodes, Annales des sciences naturelles, Paris, Éd. Crochard, vol. 16, 1829, p. 492-499 online
M. Rang, 1829 Notice sur le Litiope, nouveau genre de mollusque gastéropode Annales des sciences naturelles, Paris, Éd. Crochard, vol. 16, 1829, p. 303-307 online
M Rang, 1829 Observations de M. Rang sur une espèce nouvelle de Carinaire, Annales des sciences naturelles, Paris, Éd. Crochard, vol. 16, 1829, p. 136-140 online
M Rang, 1830 Note sur le Ropan d’Adanson et quelques autres observations sur les mollusques  Annales des sciences naturelles Paris, Éd. Crochard, vol. 21, 1830, p. 352 (chiffrée par erreur 351) online
M. Rang, 1831 Description des coquilles terrestres recueillies pendant un voyage à la côte occidentale d’Afrique, et au Brésil, Annales des sciences naturelles, Paris, Éd. Crochard, vol. 24, 1831, p. 5-63  online
 M. Rang, 1831-1843 Magasin de zoologie (publié par Félix Édouard Guérin-Méneville), Paris, Éd. Lequien puis Arthus Bertrand, 1831-1845, in-8° Numerous contributions by Sander Rang in this periodical which became, in 1839 : Magasin de zoologie, d’anatomie comparée et de palæontologie online at Gallica
M Rang, 1832 Notice sur la Galathée, genre de mollusque acéphale de la famille des Conchacées Annales des sciences naturelles, Paris, Éd. Crochard, vol. 25, 1832, p. 152-164 online
R. Rang, 1833 Dictionnaire pittoresque d’histoire naturelle et des phénomènes de la nature, contenant l’histoire des animaux, des végétaux, des minéraux(publié sous la dir. de Félix Guérin-Méneville, Paris, au Bureau de souscription, 1833-1839, 12 vol. grd in-8° online— Les planches occupent trois vol. Sander Rang a fourni plusieurs contributions à ce dictionnaire. Elles sont signées de l’initiale R. 
MM.Rang and Cailliaud, 1834 Mémoire sur le genre Éthérie et description de son animal (avec la collab. de Caillaud), 1834, 16 p. online — Extrait des Nouvelles Annales du Muséum d’histoire naturelle, t. 3, p. 128 et suivantes.
M. Rang, 1834 Mémoire sur le genre Gnatodon et description de son animal, Paris, Impr. de Jules Didot l’aîné, [1834], 13 p., in-8°  — Extrait des Nouvelles Annales du Muséum d’histoire naturelle, tome 3, p. 217 et suivantes.online
M. Rang, 1835 Mémoire sur quelques Acéphales d’eau douce du Sénégal, pour servir à la malacologie de l’Afrique occidentale », Nouvelles annales du Muséum d’histoire naturelle, Paris, Libr. encyclopédique de Roret, vol. 4, 1835, p. 297-320 online
M. Rang, 1837 Documents pour servir à l’histoire naturelle des Céphalopodes cryptodibranches, Magasin de zoologie, Paris, Éd. Lequien fils, vol. 7, 1837, p. 5-77 online
Sandar Rang and Ferdinand Denis, 1837 Fondation de la Régence d’Alger : histoire des Barberousse, chronique arabe du XVIe siècle… (avec la collab. de Ferdinand Denis), Paris, J. Angé, 1837, 2 vol. in-8° (lire en ligne [archive] [PDF]). — Rééd. : Id., Tunis, Bouslama, 1984; Fondation de la régence d’Alger : histoire des frères Barberousse, Alger, Éd. Grand-Alger-Livres, 2006.Online Volume 1, Online Volume 2
1843 Atlas des mollusques composé de 51 planches représentant la plupart des mollusques nus et des coquilles décrits dans le Manuel d’histoire naturelle, Paris, Éd. Roret, [1843], 16 p., in-16 online text Rang, Sander, 1829 above
Rang, P. C. A. L., 1852 Histoire naturelle des mollusques ptéropodes : monographie comprenant la description de toutes les espèces de ce groupe de mollusques (avec la collab. de Louis François Auguste Souleyet), Paris, Éd. J.-B. Baillière, 1852, IV-88 p., grd in-4° online, online (plates)
Port d’Alger : projet Rang, du 5 avril 1840, Paris, Impr. de H. Fournier, 1842, 8 p., in-4°. (see Sander Rang, Victor Poirel, Antoine Dominique Raffeneau de Lile et al, 1842)
1842 Précis analytique de l’histoire d’Alger sous l’occupation turque, dans Ministère de la Guerre, Tableau de la situation des établissements français dans l’Algérie en 1841, Paris, Impr. royale, décembre 1842, 445 p., in-4°  online
Sander Rang, Victor Poirel, Antoine Dominique Raffeneau de Lile et al., 1842 Projets divers pour le port d’Alger, [1842], 1 feuille 86,5 x 71,5 cm online at Gallica — Cette feuille regroupe 9 plans différents dont celui de Sander Rang.
1946 [sic] Voyage au Sénégal; Naufrage de La Méduse (ill. Philippe Ledoux), Paris, Éd. E.P.I., 1946, 121 p., in-8°. — Repris dans les recueils suivants : Relation complète du naufrage de la frégate La Méduse, faisant partie de l’expédition du Sénégal en 1816, Paris, Éd. J. de Bonnot, 1968, 419 p., in-8°; Les Naufragés : témoignages vécus, XVIIe-XXe siècle (présentation Dominique Le Brun), Paris, Éd. Omnibus, 2014, 906 p., in-8°.

Taxa named and described by Rang
Cavolinia uncinata (Rang, 1829) – Uncinate Cavoline
Cuvierina columnella|Cuvierina (Cuvierina) columnella (Rang, 1827) 
Cuvierina (Cuvierina) astesana (Rang, 1829) – (Pliocene)
Creseis  Rang, 1828 Genus
Creseis clava (Rang, 1828) (synonym: Creseis acicula (Rang, 1828)
Creseis virgula (Rang, 1828)
Creseis spinifera Rang, 1828) synonym of  Styliola subula (Quoy & Gaimard, 1827) and Genus Styliola  Gray, 1850
Dolabrifera dolabrifera (Rang, 1828)
Melibe Rang, 1829 Genus
Melibe rosea Rang, 1829
Aplysia dactylomela (Rang, 1828)
Aplysia brasiliana Rang, 1828 synonym of Aplysia fasciata Poiret, 1789 -the sooty sea hare
Aplysia keraudreni Rang, 1828
Aplysia maculata Rang, 1828
Aplysia protea Rang, 1828
Plakobranchidae Rang, 1829
Notarchus pleii (Rang, 1828): synonym of  Bursatella leachii pleii Rang, 1828
Petalifera petalifera Rang, 1828
Litiopa melanostoma (Rang, 1829)
Litiopa Rang, 1829 - the type genus of the family Litiopidae[3]
Subulina striatella (Rang, 1831): synonym of Striosubulina striatella (Rang, 1831)
Sepioteuthis biangutata Rang, 1837 synonym of Sepioteuthis sepioidea
Opeas hannense (Rang, 1831)
Subulina striatella (Rang, 1831)
Pleurodonte desidens (Rang, 1834) - was endemic to Martinique
Marginella helmatina (Rang, 1829)
Sepia hierredda Rang in Férussac & d'Orbigny, 1835 -the giant African cuttlefish
Aclesia Rang, 1828: Genus synonym of Bursatella Blainville, 1817 -the shaggy sea hare
Bulla viridis Rang in Quoy & Gaimard, 1832 Type species of Smaragdinella A. Adams, 1848
Pleurobranchus reticulatus Rang, 1832 - a sea slug
Hydromyles globulosus (Rang, 1825) - a sea slug
Fulmentum sepimentum (Rang, 1832) a sea snail
Hyalimax mauritianus Rang, 1827 - a land slug from Mauritius.
Pterosomatidae Rang, 1829 synonym of Carinariinae Blainville, 1818 
Venus rosalina Rang, 1802- a marine bivalve
Megalobulimus granulosus (Rang, 1831) - a land snail from Brazil
Loligo vitreus Rang, 1835 in Férussac  & D'Orbigny, 1834-1848 synonym of Ommastrephes bartramii (Lesueur, 1821)

Taxa named for Rang
Rangia, Desmoulins, 1832
Holopus rangi d'Orbigny, 1837.

References

Pierre Moisy, 1974 Sander Rang or the learned adventurer Revue de Saintonge et d'Aunis, Saintes, Society of Historical Archives of Saintonge and Aunis, vol.  48, n o 9,1974, p. 223-232.
Coan, E. V. & Kabat, A. R. 2018. 2,400 Years of Malacology. 15th ed., February 11, 2018, 1,594 pp. + 109 pp. [Annex 1 – Book Collations] + 65 pp. [Annex 2 – Küster Collation], 51 pp. [Annex 3 – Journal Collations].  American Malacological Society:
Françoise Legré-Zaidline, 2006 Émois romantiques à La Rochelle ou les Passions de Louise la portraitiste et de Sander le marin, Paris, Le Croît vif, coll. Témoignages, 2006, 309 p., in-8° .
Petymol
Orbigny A d' (1837) Mémoire sur une seconde espèce vivante de la familie des Crinoïdes ou Encrines, servant de type au nouveau genre Holope (Holopus). Magasin de Zoologie, 7ème année, 10:1–8, pl. 3.
Georges Cuvier, 1829 Report Verbal to French Academy of Sciences on Rang's Monograph ''Histoire naturelle des Aplysiens

French malacologists
1844 deaths
1793 births